Thomas Reidy (born November 26, 1968) is an American former badminton player. He competed in two events at the 1992 Summer Olympics. He later became the high performance director of Badminton Ireland.

References

External links
 

1968 births
Living people
American male badminton players
Olympic badminton players of the United States
Badminton players at the 1992 Summer Olympics
Sportspeople from Brooklyn
Pan American Games medalists in badminton
Pan American Games silver medalists for the United States
Badminton players at the 1995 Pan American Games
Medalists at the 1995 Pan American Games